Deferrisoma is a genus of bacteria from the phylum Thermodesulfobacteriota.

See also
 List of bacterial orders
 List of bacteria genera

References

Thermodesulfobacteriota
Bacteria genera